Schuyler Bridge, is a bridge that carries New York State Route 29 across the Hudson River east of U.S. Route 4 and NY 32
from Schuylerville in Saratoga County into Easton in Washington County. It was named for Philip Schuyler, a general in the American Revolution. Besides the bridge, NY 29 is also named the General Philip Schuyler Memorial Highway, west of Schuylerville.

See also
List of fixed crossings of the Hudson River

References

Bridges over the Hudson River
Road bridges in New York (state)
Bridges in Saratoga County, New York
Bridges in Washington County, New York